2017 Herat bombing may refer to:

June 2017 Herat mosque bombing
August 2017 Herat mosque attack